Hespererato nanhaiensis is a species of small sea snail, a marine gastropod mollusk in the family Eratoidae, the false cowries or trivias.

References

Eratoidae
Gastropods described in 1994